Valdemar of Denmark is the name of:

 Valdemar I of Denmark (1131–1182), King of Denmark from 1157 to 1182
 Valdemar of Denmark (bishop) (1158–1236), illegitimate son of Canute V
 Valdemar II of Denmark (1170–1241), King of Denmark from 1202 to 1241
 Valdemar the Young (1209–1231), co-king along with father Valdemar II
 Valdemar III, Duke of Schleswig (died 1257), son of Abel
 Valdemar IV, Duke of Schleswig (c.1262-1312), grandson of Abel and grandfather of King Valdemar III
 Valdemar III of Denmark (1314–1364), king of Denmark from 1326 to 1329
 Valdemar IV of Denmark (1320–1375), King of Denmark from 1340 to 1375
 Prince Valdemar of Denmark (1858–1939), youngest son of Christian IX